Walter Nicolás Gaitán Sayavedra (March 13, 1977) is a retired Argentine professional footballer.

An attacking midfielder, Gaitán was known for his vision on the pitch, passing, powerful left shot and a classy ball control. Nicknamed Chueco, Gaitán played his best seasons with Liga MX club Tigres UANL.

Career

Argentina and Spain
Walter Gaitán began his career in Argentina with Rosario Central in 1997.  He left the team in 1998 and moved to Villarreal of the Spanish Liga. After two years in Spain, he returned to Argentina in early 2001, joining Boca Juniors by request of coach Carlos Bianchi. Gaitán became a regular substitute of Juan Román Riquelme. He scored an early goal in semifinals of the 2001 Copa Libertadores against Palmeiras at the Estádio Palestra Itália. Boca Juniors became the 2001 Copa Libertadores champions.

On September 16, 2001, in the Superclásico of the Apertura 2001 season, at 83' he scored the 1-1 tie against River Plate at the Estadio Monumental. He scored eight goals in 12 matches of the Apertura 2001 season. In 2002, now under Óscar Tabárez, he became a regular starter in League and Copa Libertadores 2002, but gradually lower his level and went to the bench by mid-2002. Gaitán finally left Boca Juniors with 14 goals in 51 matches.

Mexico
Gaitán moved to Mexico for the 2002 Apertura season, signing with Tigres UANL of the Primera División (First Division, now Liga MX) by request of Ricardo Ferretti. After scoring four goals in 15 games in his first season, he scored eight in the 2003 Clausura. Tigres was eliminated in semifinals of the Clausura 2003 playoffs by crosstown archrival Monterrey. After a remarkable Apertura 2003 season under coach Nery Pumpido, Gaitán and Tigres lost the finals against Pachuca in the Estadio Universitario. In the Apertura 2004, as revenge of the elimination on the Clausura 2003 playoffs, Tigres won the Clásico Regiomontano by the biggest difference ever, beating Monterrey by 6-2, he scored twice. Gaitán became the top goal-scorer of the 2005 Apertura. He was also named Best Player of the Clausura 2006 tournament.

He scored a goal in the 2-1 victory of Tigres over city rival Monterrey in the finals of the 2006 InterLiga and secured 2006 Copa Libertadores. He was selected to wear the number 7, retired to honor team icon Gerónimo Barbadillo, in Copa Libertadores where regulations command that the number be used. Gaitán scored a total of four goals in Copa Libertadores with Tigres. When Tigres qualified for the Copa Libertadores, he wore the shirt of Rosario Central at the celebration.

In October 2007, Gaitán, citing personal reasons, asked for a three-month license to be absent from the team until the end of the season. In December 2007, Club Necaxa announced the incorporation of Gaitán to the team, along with Omar Ortiz. Playing for Necaxa, he scored against Tigres and former archrival Monterrey. In 2010, Gaitán played briefly for Veracruz but was ceased due professional differences.

United States
In February 2011, Gaitán was officially introduced to the squad for the Los Angeles Blues of the USL Pro.

Legacy
Gaitán was nicknamed in Mexico as "El Divino" (Spanish for "The Divine"), due his gifted touch of the ball, vision and feel of the game. In Argentina, he was known as "El Chueco" (Spanish for "The Crooked"), for being left-footed. He is considered by Mexican media and fans as one of the greatest attacking midfielders ever to play in Mexico. Gaitán declined to play the 2006 World Cup with Mexico despite the call of then coach, Ricardo La Volpe.

Being a midfielder, he finished the Apertura 2005 season as the top goal scorer of Liga MX with 14 goals. He is one of the top scorers of the Clasico Regiomontano, with eight goals. Gaitán did not achieve the League championship with Tigres, still, he is considered by the media and audience as an icon of the team, next to players such as Tomás Boy, Gerónimo Barbadillo, Osvaldo Batocletti, Claudio Núñez, Lucas Lobos and André-Pierre Gignac.

Titles

References

External links
Statistics at Guardian Stats Centre 
Walter Gaitán – Argentine Primera statistics at Fútbol XXI  
Football Database profile

1977 births
Living people
Sportspeople from La Rioja Province, Argentina
Argentine footballers
Argentine expatriate footballers
Argentine expatriate sportspeople in Spain
Naturalized citizens of Mexico
Association football forwards
Rosario Central footballers
Boca Juniors footballers
La Liga players
Villarreal CF players
Tigres UANL footballers
Club Necaxa footballers
C.D. Veracruz footballers
Orange County SC players
Atlético de Rafaela footballers
Argentine Primera División players
Liga MX players
Expatriate footballers in Mexico
Expatriate footballers in Spain
Expatriate soccer players in the United States
USL Championship players
Monterrey Flash players
Professional Arena Soccer League players